Lysiana  is a genus of hemiparasitic shrubs endemic to Australia,  in the family Loranthaceae.

Description
Lysiana is a genus of aerial shrubs, which are parasitic on the stems of their hosts. They are erect to pendulous, smooth and with no epicortical runners. The leaves are opposite, and sometimes clustered on shortened axes, and flat with pinnate venation or compressed or terete. The inflorescence is axillary, and may be either a pedunculate or sessile two-flowered umbel or a single flower. The flowers have just one bract per flower. The six Petals  are united into a curved tube inflated in middle and unequally divided, more deeply so and more reflexed on concave side. The stamens are equal. The anthers are fixed at the base, and about as long as free part of filament.

Species include 
Lysiana casuarinae  (Miq.) Tiegh. 
Lysiana exocarpi (Behr) Tiegh. (Harlequin mistletoe)
Lysiana filifolia Barlow 
Lysiana linearifolia Tiegh. 
Lysiana maritima (Barlow) Barlow 
Lysiana murrayi (F.Muell. & Tate) Tiegh.
Lysiana spathulata (Blakely) Barlow 
Lysiana subfalcata (Hook.) Barlow

References

 

 
Parasitic plants
Loranthaceae
Loranthaceae genera